Di Na Muli (Never Again) is a Philippine television drama series broadcast by TV5. Directed by Andoy Ranay, it stars Julia Barretto, Marco Gumabao and Marco Gallo. It aired from September 18, 2021, to December 18, 2021, on the network's Todo Max Weekend line up, replacing The Wall Philippines.

The series is streaming online on Vivamax.

Plot
The story of love and moving forward in life without regrets is told through the eyes of a woman burdened with precognition of specific events in the future.

Cast and characters

Main cast
 Julia Barretto as Yanna
 Marco Gumabao as Mico
 Marco Gallo as CJ

Supporting cast
 Angelu de Leon as Grace
 Bobby Andrews as Alfred
 Baron Geisler as Tomas
 Liz Alindogan as Divine
 Katya Santos as Olive 
 Lander Vera-Perez as Henry
 Krissha Viaje as Lauren
 Ashley Diaz as Angela
 Andre Yllana as Daryl
 Mickey Ferriols as Lucy
 Nicole Omillo as Chelsea

Episodes

References

2021 Philippine television series debuts
2021 Philippine television series endings
2020s Philippine television series
Filipino-language television shows
TV5 (Philippine TV network) drama series
Television series by Viva Television